Jim Godbolt (5 October 1922 – 9 January 2013) was a British jazz writer and historian.

He was born in Sidcup, Kent.  During a varied career in the music business, Godbolt worked as concert-promoter, manager to British jazz musicians, film consultant, broadcaster and compiler of album liner notes. He edited several jazz publications, including Jazz Illustrated, from 1950–51, 100 Club News, from 1979–84 and from 1980-2006 he was founding editor of Jazz at Ronnie Scott's, the house magazine of the jazz club in London.

Jim Godbolt also wrote for newspapers and periodicals, including Harpers & Queen and Melody Maker. He also headed the Jim Godbolt Entertainment Agency with Don Kingswell and looked after several groups including Swinging Blue Jeans.

Selected bibliography

Ronnie Scott's Jazz Farrago (2008), Foreword by George Melly, Hampstead Press, 
A History of Jazz in Britain 1919-1950, (2010) (4th edn.), London: Northway Publications 
A History of Jazz in Britain 1950-1970 (1989), Quartet Books,  
All This and Many a Dog: Memoirs of a Loser/Pessimist (1986), Quartet Books,  
The World of Jazz in Printed Ephemera and Collectibles (1991), Wellfleet,

References

1922 births
2013 deaths
English historians
English writers about music
Jazz writers
People from Sidcup
English male non-fiction writers